Lee Gwang-jae may refer to:
 Lee Gwang-jae (footballer)
 Lee Gwang-jae (gymnast)
 Lee Kwang-jae (politician)